is a former Japanese football player.

Playing career
After graduating from high school, he joined J2 League club Shonan Bellmare in 2002. He played many matches as substitute midfielder in 3 seasons from first season. In 2005, he moved to J2 club Kyoto Purple Sanga (later Kyoto Sanga FC). He played many matches as substitute midfielder and Sanga won the champions in 2005 season. Sanga repeated relegation to J2 and promotion to J1 from 2006. His opportunity to play decreased year by year and he could hardly play in the match in 2008. In 2009, he moved to J2 club Yokohama FC. However he could not play many matches and retired end of 2009 season.

Club statistics

References

External links

1983 births
Living people
Association football people from Saitama Prefecture
Japanese footballers
J1 League players
J2 League players
Shonan Bellmare players
Kyoto Sanga FC players
Yokohama FC players
Association football midfielders